Real Sociedad de Zacatecas was a Mexican football team from Zacatecas, México. That played for 7 years in the Ascenso MX

History
Real Sociedad Deportiva de Zacatecas was founded in 1996 by the Mexican beer brewery Modelo. In 1997 the club would reach its first final against Pachuca FC which the club would go on to lose. The club never played in the first division and in 2003 the club folded due to lack of the owners and the governor of Zacatecas fail to come up with a new contract.
In 2014 the second division returnes to Zacatecas with the new Franchise of Mineros de Zacatecas which is considered the successor of La Real.

Honours
Primera A: 0
Runner-up: Invierno 1997

Uniform

Marcas Patrocinadoras:
 1996–97 :  Joma
 1997-02 :  Corona Sport
 2002–03 :  Atlética

Defunct football clubs in Mexico
Association football clubs established in 1996
1996 establishments in Mexico
2003 disestablishments in Mexico